Francesco Traballesi was an Italian painter and architect. He was born in Florence in 1541, flourished in Rome during the papacy of Pope Gregory XIII (1572–1585), and died in 1588 in Mantua, where he was working as an architect for the duke Vincenzo Gonzaga. In the Roman church of Sant'Atanasio dei Greci, which was founded by Gregory, there are two altar-pieces by Traballesi, an Annunciation, and a Christ disputing with the Doctors, while in the Greek Pontifical College of Saint Athanasius, next to the church, are more of his paintings, with Apostles, Fathers of the Church, and a Crucifixion, which were once parts of the iconostasis of the church itself. In the Town Hall of Tivoli, anciently called Tibur in Latium, are two frescoes painted by Traballesi in 1574, showing scenes of The mythic foundation of Tibur. After his wife died, he was ordained into the Dominican order. He had three brothers who also worked in the arts: Bartolommeo Traballesi (il Gobbo) was an assistant painter for Vasari; Felice was a sculptor, and Niccolo, a silversmith. Five of his sisters were nuns in the order of St Catherine.

References

 Raffaella Casciano, Architetti ducali alla corte dei Gonzaga tra 1576 e 1595: rilettura di un’epoca di transizione, in "Atti e memorie / Accademia Nazionale Virgiliana di Scienze Lettere ed Arti", N.S. 68, 2000 (2001), pages 179–207.
 Alessandro Nesi, Dai dipinti per l’antica iconostasi di S. Atanasio dei Greci a Roma, uno spunto critico per le opere toscane di Francesco Traballesi, in "Arte cristiana", 95, 2007, 841, pages 263–274.

External links 
 The ancient iconostasis of the church of Sant'Atanasio dei Greci (it) 

16th-century Italian painters
Italian male painters
Painters from Florence
Italian Renaissance painters
1541 births
1588 deaths